WrestleWar '90: Wild Thing was a professional wrestling pay-per-view (PPV) event, produced by World Championship Wrestling (WCW) under the National Wrestling Alliance (NWA) banner. It took place on February 25, 1990, from the Greensboro Coliseum in Greensboro, North Carolina. This would be the second year in a row WCW promoted a PPV under the name "WrestleWar", a series that would include four shows in total. When the WWE Network launched in 2014 this show became available "on demand" to network subscribers.

Storylines

The WrestleWar show featured a number of professional wrestling matches with different wrestlers involved in pre-existing, scripted feuds, plots, and storylines. Wrestlers were portrayed as either heels (those that portray the "bad guys") or faces (the "good guy" characters) as they followed a series of tension-building events, which culminated in a wrestling match or series of matches.

The main event of the show was originally supposed to see Ric Flair defend the NWA World Heavyweight Championship against Sting but Sting was injured a few weeks prior during the main event of Clash of the Champions X: Texas Shootout. Sting was replaced by his longtime friend Lex Luger in the match. Luger was originally slated to defend the NWA United States Heavyweight Championship against Dr. Death Steve Williams, a match that was dropped. The opening match loss by the Dynamic Dudes (Shane Douglas and Johnny Ace) to Kevin Sullivan and Buzz Sawyer was the last time the team worked together ever again. The Chicago Street Fight between The Road Warriors (Hawk and Animal) and  The Skyscrapers saw "The Masked Skyscraper" replace Dan Spivey as Mark Callous' partner, citing an injury to Dan Spivey. The Masked Skyscraper was Mike Enos under a mask, at the time of the show Enos held the AWA World Tag Team Championship in the rival American Wrestling Association (AWA) with Wayne Bloom.

Results

See also
1990 in professional wrestling

References

External links 
 

1990 in North Carolina
1990 World Championship Wrestling pay-per-view events
Events in Greensboro, North Carolina
Professional wrestling in Greensboro, North Carolina
WrestleWar